The 172nd Ohio Infantry Regiment, sometimes 172nd Ohio Volunteer Infantry (or 172nd OVI) was an infantry regiment in the Union Army during the American Civil War.

Service
The 172nd Ohio Infantry was organized in Cambridge, Ohio, and mustered on May 14, 1864, at Columbus, Ohio, for 100 days service under the command of Colonel John Ferguson.

The regiment spent its entire enlistment engaged in guard government stores at Gallipolis, Ohio.

The 172nd Ohio Infantry mustered out of service September 3, 1864, at Gallipolis.

Ohio National Guard
Over 35,000 Ohio National Guardsmen were federalized and organized into regiments for 100 days service in May 1864. Shipped to the Eastern Theater, they were designed to be placed in "safe" rear areas to protect railroads and supply points, thereby freeing regular troops for Lt. Gen. Ulysses S. Grant’s push on the Confederate capital of Richmond, Virginia. As events transpired, many units found themselves in combat, stationed in the path of Confederate Gen. Jubal Early’s veteran Army of the Valley during its famed Valley Campaigns of 1864. Ohio Guard units met the battle-tested foe head on and helped blunt the Confederate offensive thereby saving Washington, D.C. from capture. Ohio National Guard units participated in the battles of Monacacy, Fort Stevens, Harpers Ferry, and in the siege of Petersburg.

Casualties
The regiment lost 12 enlisted men during service, all due to disease.

Commanders
 Colonel John Ferguson

See also

 List of Ohio Civil War units
 Ohio in the Civil War

References
 Dyer, Frederick H. A Compendium of the War of the Rebellion (Des Moines, IA:  Dyer Pub. Co.), 1908.
 Ohio Roster Commission. Official Roster of the Soldiers of the State of Ohio in the War on the Rebellion, 1861–1865, Compiled Under the Direction of the Roster Commission (Akron, OH: Werner Co.), 1886–1895.
 Reid, Whitelaw. Ohio in the War: Her Statesmen, Her Generals, and Soldiers (Cincinnati, OH: Moore, Wilstach, & Baldwin), 1868. 
Attribution

External links
 Ohio in the Civil War: 172nd Ohio Volunteer Infantry by Larry Stevens

Military units and formations established in 1864
Military units and formations disestablished in 1864
1864 disestablishments in Ohio
Units and formations of the Union Army from Ohio
1864 establishments in Ohio